Der Kommissar und das Meer (Swedish title: Kommissarien och havet) is a German-Swedish television series. It is loosely based on the crime novels by Mari Jungstedt. The series has been broadcast in Germany since 2007 on channels ZDF and Sat.1 emotions.

It has been shown since 2009 by the Swedish channel TV4, and has also been aired in Switzerland and Austria. In June 2020, it is available in the United States, with easy-to-read English subtitles, on the subscription channel MHzChoice.com.

References

External links

German crime television series
German-language television shows
2007 German television series debuts
2010s German television series
Television shows set in Sweden
Television shows set on islands
ZDF original programming
2000s German police procedural television series
2010s German police procedural television series
2020s German police procedural television series